Navid Rezaeifar (born August 23, 1996) is an Iranian basketball player for Shahrdari Gorgan and the Iranian national team.

He participated at the 2017 FIBA Asia Cup, and the 2020 Summer Olympics. He was named as one of the top 5 players in the 2017 William Jones Cup.

References

External links 
  on Instagram
  on Fiba
  on olympic
  on Fiba

1996 births
Living people
Iranian men's basketball players
Shooting guards
Basketball players at the 2018 Asian Games
Asian Games silver medalists for Iran
Medalists at the 2018 Asian Games
Asian Games medalists in basketball
Mahram Tehran BC players
Basketball players at the 2020 Summer Olympics
Olympic basketball players of Iran
People from Tonekabon
Sportspeople from Mazandaran province